The 2022 Charleston Southern Buccaneers football team represented Charleston Southern University as a member of the Big South Conference during the 2022 NCAA Division I FCS football season. Led by Autry Denson in his fourth and final season as head coach, the Buccaneers compiled an overall record of 2–8 with a mark of 2–3 in conference play, placing in a three-way tie for third in the Big South. Charleston Southern played home games at Buccaneer Field in Charleston, South Carolina.

Schedule

Game summaries

Western Carolina

at No. 18 (FBS) NC State

at No. 19 Eastern Kentucky

Furman

at Campbell

at Bryant

Gardner–Webb

at Kennesaw State

Robert Morris

at North Carolina A&T

References

Charleston Southern
Charleston Southern Buccaneers football seasons
Charleston Southern Buccaneers football